The 2009 Indian general election in Himachal Pradesh were held for 4 seats. Bhartiya Janata Party won 3 seats. While Indian National Congress won 1 seat.

Results

Party Wise Results

Elected MPs

See also
 Results of the 2009 Indian general election by state

Himachal
Indian general elections in Himachal Pradesh
2000s in Himachal Pradesh